In algebra, a module homomorphism is a function between modules that preserves the module structures. Explicitly, if M and N are left modules over a ring R, then a function  is called an R-module homomorphism or an R-linear map if for any x, y in M and r in R,

In other words, f is a group homomorphism (for the underlying additive groups) that commutes with scalar multiplication. If M, N are right R-modules, then the second condition is replaced with

The preimage of the zero element under f is called the kernel of f. It is an abelian group (under pointwise addition) but is not necessarily a module unless R is commutative.

The composition of module homomorphisms is again a module homomorphism, and the identity map on a module is a module homomorphism. Thus, all the (say left) modules together with all the module homomorphisms between them form the category of modules.

Terminology 
A module homomorphism is called a module isomorphism if it admits an inverse homomorphism; in particular, it is a bijection. Conversely, one can show a bijective module homomorphism is an isomorphism; i.e., the inverse is a module homomorphism. In particular, a module homomorphism is an isomorphism if and only if it is an isomorphism between the underlying abelian groups.

The isomorphism theorems hold for module homomorphisms.

A module homomorphism from a module M to itself is called an endomorphism and an isomorphism from M to itself an automorphism. One writes  for the set of all endomorphisms of a module M. It is not only an abelian group but is also a ring with multiplication given by function composition, called the endomorphism ring of M. The group of units of this ring is the automorphism group of M. 

Schur's lemma says that a homomorphism between simple modules (modules with no non-trivial submodules) must be either zero or an isomorphism. In particular, the endomorphism ring of a simple module is a division ring.

In the language of the category theory, an injective homomorphism is also called a monomorphism and a surjective homomorphism an epimorphism.

Examples 
The zero map M → N that maps every element to zero.
A linear transformation between vector spaces.
.
For a commutative ring R and ideals I, J, there is the canonical identification

In particular,  is the annihilator of I.
Given a ring R and an element r, let  denote the left multiplication by r. Then for any s, t in R,
.
That is,  is right R-linear.
For any ring R,
 as rings when R is viewed as a right module over itself. Explicitly, this isomorphism is given by the left regular representation .
Similarly,  as rings when R is viewed as a left module over itself. Textbooks or other references usually specify which convention is used.
 through  for any left module M. (The module structure on Hom here comes from the right R-action on R; see #Module structures on Hom below.)
Given a ring homomorphism R → S of commutative rings and an S-module M, an R-linear map θ: S → M is called a derivation if for any f, g in S, .
If S, T are unital associative algebras over a ring R, then an algebra homomorphism from S to T is a ring homomorphism that is also an R-module homomorphism.

Module structures on Hom 
In short, Hom inherits a ring action that was not used up to form Hom. More precise, let M, N be left R-modules. Suppose M has a right action of a ring S that commutes with the R-action; i.e., M is an (R, S)-module. Then

has the structure of a left S-module defined by: for s in S and x in M,

It is well-defined (i.e.,  is R-linear) since

.

Note: the above verification would "fail" if one used the left R-action in place of the right S-action. In this sense, Hom is often said to "use up" the R-action.

A matrix representation 
The relationship between matrices and linear transformations in linear algebra generalizes in a natural way to module homomorphisms between free modules. Precisely, given a right R-module U, there is the canonical isomorphism of the abelian groups

obtained by viewing  consisting of column vectors and then writing f as an m × n matrix. In particular, viewing R as a right R-module and using , one has
,
which turns out to be a ring isomorphism (as a composition corresponds to a matrix multiplication).

Note the above isomorphism is canonical; no choice is involved. On the other hand, if one is given a module homomorphism between finite-rank free modules, then a choice of an ordered basis corresponds to a choice of an isomorphism . The above procedure then gives the matrix representation with respect to such choices of the bases. For more general modules, matrix representations may either lack uniqueness or not exist.

Defining 
In practice, one often defines a module homomorphism by specifying its values on a generating set. More precisely, let M and N be left R-modules. Suppose a subset S generates M; i.e., there is a surjection  with a free module F with a basis indexed by S and kernel K (i.e., one has a free presentation). Then to give a module homomorphism  is to give a module homomorphism  that kills K (i.e., maps K to zero).

Operations 

and their tensor product is

Let  be a module homomorphism between left modules. The graph Γf of f is the submodule of M ⊕ N given by
,
which is the image of the module homomorphism 

The transpose of f is

If f is an isomorphism, then the transpose of the inverse of f is called the contragredient of f.

Exact sequences 
Consider a sequence of module homomorphisms

(If the numbers increase instead of decrease, then it is called a cochain complex; e.g., de Rham complex.) A chain complex is called an exact sequence if . A special case of an exact sequence is a short exact sequence:

Any module homomorphism  defines an exact sequence

In the case of modules over a commutative ring, a sequence is exact if and only if it is exact at all the maximal ideals; that is all sequences 

are exact, where the subscript  means the localization at a maximal ideal .

If  are module homomorphisms, then they are said to form a fiber square (or pullback square), denoted by M ×B N, if it fits into

where .

Example: Let  be commutative rings, and let I be the annihilator of the quotient B-module A/B (which is an ideal of A). Then canonical maps  form a fiber square with

Endomorphisms of finitely generated modules 
Let  be an endomorphism between finitely generated R-modules for a commutative ring R. Then
 is killed by its characteristic polynomial relative to the generators of M; see Nakayama's lemma#Proof.
If  is surjective, then it is injective.

See also: Herbrand quotient (which can be defined for any endomorphism with some finiteness conditions.)

Variant: additive relations 

An additive relation  from a module M to a module N is a submodule of  In other words, it is a "many-valued" homomorphism defined on some submodule of M. The inverse  of f is the submodule . Any additive relation f determines a homomorphism from a submodule of M to a quotient of N

where  consists of all elements x in M such that (x, y) belongs to f for some y in N.

A transgression that arises from a spectral sequence is an example of an additive relation.

See also 
Mapping cone (homological algebra)
Smith normal form
Chain complex
Pairing

Notes

References 
Bourbaki, Algebra. Chapter II.
S. MacLane, Homology
H. Matsumura, Commutative ring theory. Translated from the Japanese by M. Reid. Second edition. Cambridge Studies in Advanced Mathematics, 8.

Algebra